Kalembouly is a town in the Siby Department of Balé Province in south-western Burkina Faso. The town has a population of 1,190.

References

Populated places in the Boucle du Mouhoun Region
Balé Province